The Anglican Church of St Nicholas in Holton, Somerset, England was built in the 14th century. It is a Grade II* listed building.

History

The church was built in the 14th century and later added to. The north aisle was added in the 18th century.

The parish is part of the Camelot parishes benefice within the Diocese of Bath and Wells.

Architecture

The stone building has Welsh slate roofs. It consists of a tow-bay nave and two-bay chancel with a north aisle, with vestry, and a south porch. The two-stage west tower is supported by diagonal buttresses. The tower has three bells, the oldest of which was cast around 1420.

The interior fittings include an octagonal  15th century pulpit and font believed to be from the 12th century.

See also  
 List of ecclesiastical parishes in the Diocese of Bath and Wells

References

Grade II* listed buildings in South Somerset
Grade II* listed churches in Somerset
Church of England church buildings in South Somerset